Peter Alfred Jensen (7 July 1903 – 13 January 1988) was a Danish politician and government minister. He was a member of the Danish Communist Party (DKP) of which he served as vice-chairman.

Jensen was born in Århus. He was a member of Frihedsrådet during the Second World War. He became a minister of transport in the "liberation" cabinet of Vilhelm Buhl. He was first elected to parliament in 1936 and retired in 1960.

During the 1950s his house was put under surveillance by the Danish Gladio, according to the official PET Commission.

References

External links
The Cultural Cold War in Western Europe, 1945-60 p. 239

External links

1903 births
1988 deaths
Members of the Folketing
Communist Party of Denmark politicians
Politicians from Aarhus
Transport ministers of Denmark